Shibpur is an upazila of Narsingdi District in the Division of Dhaka, Bangladesh.

Geography
It has 44365 households and total area 206.89 km2.

Demographics
As of the 1991 Bangladesh census, Shibpur has a population of 237246.  Males constitute 50.77% of the population, and females 49.23%. This Upazila's eighteen up population is 117487.  Shibpur has an average literacy rate of 32.3% (7+ years), and the national average of 32.4% literate.

Economy
Shibpur is a densely industrial area, and is home to many textile mills. Narsingdi gas field is located in the Shibpur upazila under Narsingdi district adjacent to the Dhaka-Sylhet highway about 45 km away of northernmost east direction from capital city of Bangladesh, Dhaka. This field was discovered by Petrobangla in 1990. Total recoverable gas reserves of this field re-estimated by Hydrocarbon Unit is 215 billion cubic feet (6.1×109 m3). Commercial gas production was started in 1996 and till 31 August 2006 total 66.304 billion cubic feet (1.8775×109 m3) or 30.84 percent of gas reserves has been recovered.

Administration
Shibpur Upazila is divided into Shibpur Municipality and nine union parishads: Ayubpur, Baghabo, Chakradha, Dulalpur, Joshar, Joynagar, Masimpur, Putia, and Sadharchar. The union parishads are subdivided into 115 mauzas and 194 villages.

Shibpur Municipality is subdivided into 9 wards and 17 mahallas.

Education
 Gov. Saheed Asad College
Baghabo Union High School
Brammondi govt Primary school
Kundar para Govt Primary school
Shibpur Pilot Model High School
Shibpur Saheed Asad Collegiate Girl's High School & College
Shibpur Pilot Girls High School
Abdul Mannan Bhuiyan College
Abdul Mannan Bhuiyan Adarsho Biddyapith
Shibpur Model Gov Primary School
Masimpur Gov. Primary School
Datter Gaon Gov. Primary School
 Datter Gaon High School
 Sabuj Pahar College, Shibpur
 Harihardi High School & College, Shibpur
 Shibpur Model College
 Syed Nagar Govt. Primary School
 Syed Nagar Ataur Rahman High School
 Dulalpur High School
Telia Jawakandi high School
 Moharpara High School
Doripura Model High School
Lakhpur Shimulia High School
Kharia High School & College
chaitainno High school 
Majlishpur High School
Gashutia Govt. Primary School

Notable residents
 Amanullah Asaduzzaman, Language martyr, was born in Shibpur.
 Abdul Mannan Bhuiyan

See also
 Upazilas of Bangladesh
 Districts of Bangladesh
 Divisions of Bangladesh

References

Upazilas of Narsingdi District